Semi Ravouvou Ravouvou (birth date unknown – circa 1967) was a Fijian cricketer.

Ravouvou played a single first-class appearance for the Fiji in 1948 against Auckland during Fiji's tour of New Zealand. During the match he scored eight runs in the match.

During the same tour Ravouvou played six non first-class matches for Fiji, with his final match on tour coming against Bay of Plenty.

Ravouvou's exact date of birth is unknown, only that he died circa 1967 at Saunaka, Nadi.

References

External links
 Semi Ravouvou at Cricinfo
 Semi Ravouvou at CricketArchive

Fijian cricketers
I-Taukei Fijian people
Sportspeople from Nadi